Tanmay is an Indian masculine given name. Notable people with the name include:

Tanmay Bhat
Tanmay Shah
Tanmay Jahagirdar
Tanmay Mishra
Tanmay Ssingh
Tanmay Srivastava
Tanmay Agarwal
Tanmay Ghosh

Indian masculine given names